Panah Kandi (also Romanized as Panāh Kandī) is a village in Zangebar Rural District, in the Central District of Poldasht County, West Azerbaijan Province, Iran. At the 2006 census, its population was 248, in 69 families.

References 

Populated places in Poldasht County